Bart van Rooij (born 26 May 2001) is a Dutch professional footballer who plays as a right-back for Eredivisie club NEC.

Club career
Van Rooij played at SV Estria until 2010 and since 2010 in the youth department of NEC. On 22 February 2019 he made his debut for the club against Almere City FC.

References

External links
 

2001 births
Living people
Association football forwards
Dutch footballers
Netherlands youth international footballers
NEC Nijmegen players
Eredivisie players
Eerste Divisie players
People from Grave, North Brabant
Footballers from North Brabant